Yang Chaohui (born 29 May 1998) is a Chinese footballer currently playing as a defender for Nanjing City.

Club career
In 2016, while playing for Guangzhou, he was invited to trial with Dutch side SC Heerenveen alongside compatriot Qian Yumiao. However, neither player was signed by Heerenveen, and they both moved to Portugal to sign for Vizela, with Yang joining on loan. On his return to Guangzhou, he was loaned out again, this time to fellow Chinese club Tianjin Tianhai. He was loaned to K3 League side Busan in 2018, where he made twelve league appearances.

In 2019 he was linked with a loan move to Hong Kong Premier League side Kitchee, but despite spending time training with the Hong Kong club, this move failed to materialise. The following year, he was loaned to China League One side Beijing Chengfeng. He was loaned to Suzhou Dongwu in 2021, and was suspended for three games after kicking an opposition player during a China League One fixture.

He left Guangzhou permanently in April 2022, joining fellow Chinese Super League side Chongqing Liangjiang Athletic. However, this stay did not last long, and in June of the same year, he joined Nanjing City, following the dissolution of Chongqing Liangjiang Athletic.

Career statistics

Club

Notes

References

1998 births
Living people
Chinese footballers
China youth international footballers
Association football defenders
K3 League (2007–2019) players
China League One players
Guangzhou F.C. players
F.C. Vizela players
Tianjin Tianhai F.C. players
Beijing Renhe F.C. players
Suzhou Dongwu F.C. players
Chongqing Liangjiang Athletic F.C. players
Nanjing City F.C. players
Chinese expatriate footballers
Chinese expatriate sportspeople in Portugal
Expatriate footballers in Portugal
Chinese expatriate sportspeople in South Korea
Expatriate footballers in South Korea